Jakkapan, Jakkaphan, Jukkapant or Jakrapun is a masculine Thai given name. Notable people with the given name include:
Jakrapun Kornburiteerachote, Thai singer
Jakkaphan Kaewprom, Thai footballer
Jakkapan Pornsai, Thai footballer
Jakkapan Praisuwan, Thai footballer
Jakkapan Prommaros, Thai footballer
Jukkapant Punpee, Thai football coach
Jakrapan Thanathiratham, Thai badminton player

Thai masculine given names